Arthur Samuel Goodeve (December 15, 1860 – November 22, 1920) was a Canadian pharmacist and Conservative politician. After a turn as mayor of Rossland, British Columbia, from 1889 to 1890, he was appointed BC's Provincial Secretary in 1903. He represented Kootenay in the House of Commons of Canada from 1908 to 1912, when he resigned upon being appointed as Railway Commissioner for Canada.

He died at the Toronto General Hospital on November 22, 1920.

References

External links
 

1860 births
1920 deaths
Conservative Party of Canada (1867–1942) MPs
Members of the House of Commons of Canada from British Columbia